Albert Robert Morgan (born 2 February 2000) is an English professional footballer who plays as a midfielder for  club Charlton Athletic.

Career
Born in Portsmouth, Morgan joined Charlton Athletic at a young age and signed his first professional contract in May 2018. Following his promotion to the first-team squad, Morgan made his Charlton debut during their EFL Cup tie against AFC Wimbledon, featuring for the entire 90 minutes in the 2–2 draw.

On 10 October 2019, Morgan joined Ebbsfleet United on an initial 28-day loan. Morgan was recalled by Charlton Athletic on 19 November 2019.

Career statistics

References

2000 births
Living people
Footballers from Portsmouth
Association football midfielders
Charlton Athletic F.C. players
English Football League players
English footballers